The Alaska Goldpanners of Fairbanks are a collegiate summer baseball team which was founded in 1960 as an independent barnstorming team. The Goldpanners were charter members of the Alaska Baseball League at the league's inception in 1974. The Goldpanners play their home games at Growden Memorial Park in Fairbanks, Alaska, United States. They also host the annual Midnight Sun Game at their home venue.

Like other amateur collegiate summer baseball teams, the Goldpanners operate in a similar manner to professional minor league organizations: playing a nightly schedule, using wooden bats, and with lengthy road trips facing advanced competition. Facing a unique challenge due to Fairbanks' isolated location, the Goldpanners often play teams from the rest of Alaska and the West Coast of the Lower 48.

History
Founded by H. A. Boucher in 1960, Fairbanks' baseball team first made national news when the Pan-Alaska Gold Panners appeared in the  1962 National Baseball Congress championship game. Following a business re-organization led by W.G. Stroecker in 1963, the team changed was renamed the Alaska Goldpanners.

From 1970 to 1972, the Goldpanners were a member of the Big West Conference, along with the Anchorage Glacier Pilots, Humboldt Crabs, Grand Junction Eagles, and Bellingham Bells. In 1967, the Goldpanners were in the inaugural Western Baseball Association with Humboldt, Grand Junction, Bellingham, and the Santa Rosa Rosebuds.

In 1974, the Goldpanners were founding members of the Alaska Baseball League.

In 2008, former Goldpanner Bill "Spaceman" Lee returned to Fairbanks as an alumnus of the Midnight Sun Game.  During his time with the club, which included a win for Lee in the Midnight Sun Game, Bill declared that the Goldpanners were "the number one amateur baseball organization in history."

The Goldpanners did not play in 2011 due to financial difficulties.

The Goldpanners announced in September 2015 that they were leaving the league and would instead play a barnstorming schedule so that they would be available to play in the National Baseball Congress championship game which is held before the end of the ABL season. In 2020, they applied to rejoin the league for the 2021 season and were denied.

League and Tournament Wins

1960 North of the Range League
1961 North of the Range League
1961 Alaska Regional NBC Tournament
1962 North of the Range League
1962 Alaska Regional NBC Tournament
1962 Alaska Regional NBC Tournament
1964 Alaska Regional NBC Tournament
1966 Hawaii International baseball tournament
1966 World baseball tournament
1970 Alaska Baseball League
1970 Big West Conference Tournament
1972 Alaska Baseball League
1972 National Baseball Congress World Series
1973 Alaska World Series
1973 National Baseball Congress World Series
1974 Kamloops, B.C., International Baseball Tournament
1974 National Baseball Congress World Series
1974 Kamloops, B.C., International Baseball Tournament
1975 Kamloops, B.C., International Baseball Tournament
1976 National Baseball Congress World Series
1976 Kamloops, B.C., International Baseball Tournament
1977 Kamloops, B.C., International Baseball Tournament
1978 Alaska Baseball League
1979 Alaska Baseball League
1980 Alaska Baseball League
1980 National Baseball Congress World Series
1981 Alaska Baseball League
1982 Alaska Baseball League
1983 Alaska Baseball League
1984 Alaska Baseball League
1986 Alaska Baseball League Pacific Division
1988 U.S. Open Baseball Tournament - Tahoe
1990 U.S. Open Baseball Tournament - Ontario
1991 Alaska Baseball League
1993 Alaska Federation
1994 Alaska Baseball League
1994 Alaska baseball tournament
1995 Alaska Federation
1995 Alaska Baseball League
1996 Hawaii International Baseball Tournament
2001 Wood Bat Invitation Tournament
2002 Alaska Baseball League
2002 National Baseball Congress World Series
2003 Alaska Baseball League
2003 Wood Bat Invitation Tournament
2005 Alaska Baseball League
2009 Kamloops, B.C., International Baseball Tournament
2013 Barona Bash Invitational Tournament
2013 Alaska Baseball League
2014 Alaska Baseball League
2019 Grand Forks International Baseball Tournament

Notable alumni

Mike Boddicker
Barry Bonds
Bob Boone
Bret Boone
Pete Broberg
Roger Clemens
Bobby Crosby
Alvin Davis
Terry Francona 
Jason Giambi
Aaron Heilman
Kevin Higgins
Adam Kennedy
Dave Kingman
Bill "Spaceman" Lee
Travis Lee
Don Leppert
Shane Mack
Oddibe McDowell
Kevin McReynolds
Kris Medlen
Andy Messersmith
Rick Monday
Curt Motton
Graig Nettles
Brendan Ryan
Tom Seaver 
Dave Winfield
Michael Young
Alex Vesia

Midnight Sun game

First held in 1906, the annual Midnight Sun Game is held yearly in Fairbanks, hosted by the Goldpanners.  The game, which begins at 10:30 PM on the night of the summer solstice, has gained the attention of international media.

Baseball America declared the game one of the "10 Must-See Baseball Events."  In 2005, ESPN spotlighted the game during "50 States in 50 Days."  ESPN The Magazine called the event the "#8 Ultimate Baseball Experience."  The Sporting News declared that on the 21st of June, "Fairbanks is the Baseball Capitol of America".   In 2012, Yankees Magazine declared the game "Baseball's Most Natural Promotion".

Quotes
"I've been lucky enough to attend many World Series, All-Star Games and Opening Days but the Midnight Sun Game is in a league of its own." – Greg S. Harris, National Baseball Hall of Fame and Museum.

"Everybody should have an opportunity to come to Alaska and see the Midnight Sun Game."  – Bobby Doerr, Boston Red Sox alumnus and Major League Baseball Hall of Famer

2022 roster

Manager: Mark Lindsay
Assistant Coaches: Ryan Handon, Marcus Mastrobuoni and Jake Taylor
Pitchers
RJ Aranda
Ian Torpey
Corey Braun
Garrett Cooper
Nolan Meredith
Raymond Padilla
Matthew Pinal
Ethan Remmers
Logan Smith
Andrew Troppmann
Steven Vazquez
Kegan Wentz
Catchers
Rafael Flores
Brock Rudy
Issac Schuck
Infielders
Cole Alexander
Alex Garcia
Griffin Harrison
Caleb Millikan
Marty Munoz
Tate Shimao
Dalton Sloniger
Outfielders
Cayden Clark
Dominic Hughes
Brock Kleszcz
Sean Rimmer

References

External links
 
 Alaska Baseball League

1960 establishments in Alaska
Alaska Baseball League
Amateur baseball teams in Alaska
Sports in Fairbanks, Alaska
Baseball teams established in 1960
Baseball teams in Alaska